Goodbye is Dubstar's second album. It was released in September 1997 on the Food Records label, a division of EMI that was also home to Blur.

Track listing
All songs written by Steve Hillier except where noted.
"I Will Be Your Girlfriend" (Hillier, Chris Wilike) - 3:37 
"Inside" - 3:44
"No More Talk" - 3:39
"Polestar" - 3:40 
"Say the Worst Thing First" - 4:07
"Cathedral Park" - 3:14
"It's Over" - 4:18
"The View From Here" - 3:42
"My Start in Wallsend" - 4:29
"It's Clear" (Hillier, Wilike) - 2:22
"Ghost" - 3:36
"Can't Tell Me" - 3:21
"Wearchest" (Hillier, Wilike) - 3:15
"When You Say Goodbye" (Sarah Blackwood, Hillier, Wilike) - 3:14
"Let's Go" - 4:20

Japan bonus tracks
The Japanese release includes the B-sides from lead single "No More Talk" as bonus tracks.

Personnel
 Sarah Blackwood, lead vocalist
 Steve Hillier, songwriting & programming
 Chris Wilkie, guitarist

Additional personnel
 Paul Wadsworth - drums
Audrey Riley – cello
Phil Spalding – bass

U.S. release
Goodbye was the band's first album released in the U.S. For this American edition, six songs were removed from the UK version and replaced with tracks from their previous UK release, Disgraceful. The rearranged track listing includes "Stars" and "Not So Manic Now," the most popular singles from Disgraceful, as well as some of their remixes.

All songs written by Steve Hillier except where otherwise noted. Songs not on UK release are noted in italics.

"Stars"
"Inside"
"Cathedral Park"
"Just a Girl She Said" (Sarah Blackwood, Steve Hillier, Chris Wilkie)
"The View From Here"
"It's Clear" (Hillier, Wilkie)
"No More Talk"
"Anywhere" (Hillier, Wilkie)
"Ghost"
"Can't Tell Me" (Wilkie)
"I Will Be Your Girlfriend" (Hillier, Wilkie)
"Wearchest" (Hillier, Wilkie)
"St. Swithin's Day" (Billy Bragg)
"Not So Manic Now" (Dave Harling, Jon Kirby, Martin Mason, Graeme Robinson)
"Stars" (Motiv 8 mix)
"Not So Manic Now" (Way Out West mix)
"Stars" (Way Out West mix)

Singles
The following singles were released from the album, in order of release date. All songs written by Steve Hillier except where otherwise noted:

 "No More Talk"
CD 1
"Unchained Monologue" (Hillier/Wilkie)
"La Boheme" (Charles Aznavour)
"Goodbye" (Blackwood/hillier/Wilkie)
CD 2
"Stars" (acoustic)
"Elevator song" (acoustic)
"Not Once Not Ever" (acoustic)

 "Cathedral Park"
"Let Down" (Wilkie)
"This Is My Home"
"In My Defence"

 "I Will Be Your Girlfriend"
"Not So Manic Now" (Dave Harling, Jon Kirby, Martin Mason, Graeme Robinson)
"Stars"
"Anywhere" (Hillier/Wilkie)

All songs are identical to the versions previously released as singles and on the album Disgraceful.

References

External links

Goodbye at YouTube (streamed copy where licensed)

1997 albums
Dubstar albums
Albums produced by Stephen Hague